Hypercompe kinkelini is a moth of the family Erebidae first described by Hermann Burmeister in 1880. It is found in Argentina.

Etymology
The species is named is in honor of Kinkelin, who collected the type specimens.

References

Hypercompe
Moths described in 1880